was a province of Japan in the area that is northern Okayama Prefecture in the Chūgoku region of western Japan. Mimasaka bordered Bitchū, Bizen, Harima, Hōki, and Inaba Provinces. In terms of the Gokishichidō system, Mimasaka was one of the provinces of the San'in circuit. Under the Engishiki classification system, Mimasaka was ranked as one of the 35 "superior countries" (上国) in terms of importance, and one of the "near countries" (近国) in terms of distance from the capital. The provincial capital was located in what is now the city of Tsuyama.

Geography
Mimasaka was a landlocked province on the southern side of the Chugoku Mountains. The area is very mountainous, and is divided into three major river basins. In the east is the Asahi River which flows through the Maniwa Basin. In the center is the Yoshii River, which flows through the Tsuyama Basin, and to the west is the Mimasaka area, which contains three smaller river basins. Due to this geography, the main transportation method in pre-modern times was by boat.

History
This separation was the final stage of the disintegration of the former Kingdom of Kibi, and was intended to further weaken the Kibi clan by putting its iron resources directly under the control of the Yamato government. In Mimasaka, there are many place names that are directly linked to people or places in Yamato. The ruins of the kokufu have been located within what is now the city of Tsuyama. The site is now located under the Tsuyama Sōja Shinto shrine. The Mimasaka Kokubun-ji and the ruins of the Mimasaka Kokubun-niji as located nearby, The ichinomiya of the province is the Nakayama Shrine, also located in Tsuyama.

During the Heian period, the area was part of the holdings of the Heike clan, and in the Kamakura period, Kajiwara no Kagetoki followed by Wada Yoshimori served as shugo before the province came under they direct control of the Hōjō clan. In the Muromachi period, the Ashikaga clan took over the former Hōjō holdings. However, no central powerful local clan ever rose to prominence and the province was destined to change hands frequently between warring factions in the Sengoku period, with control shifting between the Yamana clan, the Akamatsu clan, the Amago clan, the Urakami clan, and the Ukita clan, and finally, after the Battle of Sekigahara in 1600, becoming united again with Bizen Province under Kobayakawa Hideaki. However, after his death without heir only two years later, the Tokugawa shogunate assigned most of the province to the Mori clan as Tsuyama Domain. The Mori moved the capital of the province  from the Innoshō area to their newly built jōkamachi at Tsuyama. The Mori clan were replaced by a cadet branch of the Echizen-Matsudaira clan in 1697, but the size of the domain was reduced to only 100,000 koku, and later to 50,000 koku. Another domain, Katsuyama Domain (23,000 koku) was created for the Miura clan in 1767. Mimasaka was the home of the samurai Miyamoto Musashi, the author of The Book of Five Rings.

In 1871, following the abolition of the han system, Mimasaka was divided into Tsuyama, Mashima, Kurashiki, Tsuruta, Koromo, Koga, Ikuno, Akashi, Numata, and Tatsuno prefectures, which were merged with Okayama Prefecture inI 1876.
Per the early Meiji period , an official government assessment of the nation’s resources, the province had 766 villages with a total kokudaka of 263,477 koku.

Gallery

Notes

References
 Nussbaum, Louis-Frédéric and Käthe Roth. (2005).  Japan encyclopedia. Cambridge: Harvard University Press. ;  OCLC 58053128

External links 

  Murdoch's map of provinces, 1903

Former provinces of Japan
Mimasaka Province
History of Okayama Prefecture
1871 disestablishments in Japan
States and territories disestablished in 1871